also known as Takeisao Shrine, is a Shinto shrine in the city of Kyoto, Japan. One of the four shrines that protect Kyoto, it protects Kyoto from the North and Oda Nobunaga, a daimyō and key figure in the unification of Japan during the late 16th century, is deified and buried inside.

Funaoka Matsuri
The Funaoka Matsuri is a festival held every year on October 19 at Kenkun shrine commemorating the day when Nobunaga first entered Kyoto in 1568. Young boys dressed in samurai armor portray Nobunaga's army as they marched into Kyoto to take control of the government.

See also
List of Shinto shrines in Kyoto
Four Symbols
Black Tortoise
Oda Nobunaga

References

External links
Official website

Shinto shrines in Kyoto
Religious buildings and structures completed in 1869
Religious organizations established in 1869
1869 establishments in Japan